Emeterio Villanueva (born 3 March 1946) is a Mexican boxer. He competed in the men's light middleweight event at the 1972 Summer Olympics.

References

External links
 

1946 births
Living people
Light-middleweight boxers
Mexican male boxers
Olympic boxers of Mexico
Boxers at the 1972 Summer Olympics
Boxers at the 1971 Pan American Games
Pan American Games medalists in boxing
Pan American Games silver medalists for Mexico
Place of birth missing (living people)
Medalists at the 1971 Pan American Games